Bravo is the seventh album by the hard rock band Dr. Sin. It was released in July 2007 by Century Media in Brazil.

Track listing

Chart positions

Personnel 
 Andria Busic – bass, lead vocals
 Ivan Busic – drums, backing vocals
 Eduardo Ardanuy – guitars

Special guests 
 Gus Monsanto on the track Drowning in Sin.
 Hudson Cadorini on the track Think it Over.

Notes 
 Eric Martin (ex-Mr. Big) would do a special participation on the track Wake Up Call, but he couldn't come to Brazil in time to do the record.

References 

2007 albums
Dr. Sin albums
Century Media Records albums